Tanyard Branch may refer to:

Tanyard Branch (Marshyhope Creek tributary), a stream in Delaware
Tanyard Branch (Yahoola Creek tributary), a stream in Georgia
Tanyard Branch (Salt River tributary), a stream in Missouri
Tanyard Branch (Cherrystone Creek tributary), a stream in Pittsylvania County, Virginia

See also
Tanyard Creek (disambiguation)